Benton Township is a township in Lucas County, Iowa, United States.

History
Benton Township was organized in 1853. It is named for Thomas Hart Benton, a senator from Missouri.

References

Townships in Lucas County, Iowa
Townships in Iowa
Populated places established in 1853